is a railway station on the Echigo Line in Nishi-ku, Niigata, Niigata Prefecture, Japan, operated by East Japan Railway Company (JR East).

Lines

Station layout
The station consists of a ground-level island platform serving two tracks. The station is unattended. Suica farecard can be used at this station.

Platforms

History 
The station opened on 25 December 1914. With the privatization of Japanese National Railways (JNR) on 1 April 1987, the station came under the control of JR East.

Surrounding area
 Niigata University of International and Information Studies
 Sakata Lagoon

See also
 List of railway stations in Japan

References

External links

  

Railway stations in Niigata (city)
Railway stations in Japan opened in 1914
Stations of East Japan Railway Company
Echigo Line